The 2014–15 Slovenian Basketball League, also known as the 2014–15 Telemach League due to sponsorship reasons, was the 24th season of the Premier A Slovenian Basketball League, the highest professional basketball league in Slovenia.
Tajfun won its first title, by defeating Rogaška 3–1 in the finals.

Regular season

|}

Second round

Group A

|}

Group B
Results between teams in the regular season remained in effect for the second round for Group B.

|}

Playoffs

The Playoffs began on Thursday, May 5, 2015 and concluded at May 28, 2015.

Relegation Playoffs
The two bottom teams of the season played against the two best teams from the Slovenian Second Division. All teams played each other at home and away.

|}

Awards

Regular Season MVP
 Sašo Zagorac (Zlatorog Laško)

Season MVP
 Sašo Zagorac (Zlatorog Laško)

Finals MVP
 Dragiša Drobnjak (Tajfun)

Weekly MVP

Regular season

Note

 – Co-MVP's were announced.

Second round

Statistical leaders

| width=50% valign=top |

Points

|}
|}

| width=50% valign=top |

Assists

|}
|}

References

Slovenian Basketball League seasons
Slovenia
1